The Obispo Ramos de Lora Municipality is one of the 23 municipalities (municipios) that makes up the Venezuelan state of Mérida and, according to a 2007 population estimate by the National Institute of Statistics of Venezuela, the municipality has a population of 25,002.  The town of Santa Elena de Arenales is the shire town of the Obispo Ramos de Lora Municipality.

Demographics
The Obispo Ramos de Lora Municipality, according to a 2007 population estimate by the National Institute of Statistics of Venezuela, has a population of 25,002 (up from 21,496 in 2000). This amounts to 2.96% of the state's population.

Government
The mayor of the Obispo Ramos de Lora Municipality is Humberto Gómez, re-elected on October 31, 2004 with 49% of the vote.  The municipality is divided into three parishes;  Capital Obispo Ramos de Lora, Eloy Paredes, and San Rafael de Alcázar.

See also
Santa Elena de Arenales
Mérida
Municipalities of Venezuela

References

Municipalities of Mérida (state)